The Division of Maribyrnong is an Australian electoral division in the state of Victoria. It is located in the inner north-western suburbs of Melbourne. Suburbs include Aberfeldie, Airport West, Avondale Heights, Essendon, Footscray, Gowanbrae, Keilor East, Maribyrnong, Moonee Ponds, Niddrie, West Footscray and Tullamarine. Due to redistributions, the division has been slowly moving west and changed with the introduction of the  Division of Fraser in 2018. According to the 2011 census, Maribyrnong has the highest proportion of Catholics in any Commonwealth Electoral Division in Australia with 41.6% of the population.

Geography
Since 1984, federal electoral division boundaries in Australia have been determined at redistributions by a redistribution committee appointed by the Australian Electoral Commission. Redistributions occur for the boundaries of divisions in a particular state, and they occur every seven years, or sooner if a state's representation entitlement changes or when divisions of a state are malapportioned.

History

The division was proclaimed at the redistribution of 13 July 1906, and was first contested at the 1906 election. The division was named after the Maribyrnong River, which runs through it. A safe Labor seat for most of the first half of the 20th century, it became a marginal Liberal seat for most of the 1950s and 1960s, in part due to the influence of the Democratic Labor Party. Labor retook the seat in 1969, and for most of the time since then, it has been a comfortably safe Labor seat.

Prominent former members include James Fenton, a minister under James Scullin and Joseph Lyons; Arthur Drakeford, a minister under John Curtin, Frank Forde and Ben Chifley; and Moss Cass, a minister under Gough Whitlam. The current member for Maribyrnong since the 2007 election is the former National Secretary of the Australian Workers' Union and former Opposition Leader Bill Shorten.

Members

Election results

References

External links
 Maribyrnong Covered Suburbs - Australian Electoral Commission

Electoral divisions of Australia
Constituencies established in 1906
1906 establishments in Australia
City of Brimbank
Essendon, Victoria
Flemington, Victoria
Electoral districts and divisions of Greater Melbourne